Natalie Kimberly "Kim" Seybold-Catron (born September 18, 1965) is an American former pair skater. Competing with her brother Wayne Seybold, she won five senior international medals, became a two-time U.S. national silver medalist, and competed at the 1988 Winter Olympics. The pair grew up in Marion, Indiana and were coached by Ronald Ludington from 1984 in Wilmington, Delaware.

Seybold married a former hockey player, Mark Catron, with whom she has two daughters, Kaitlyn and Ashley. She underwent operations to remove a brain tumor in 1995, 2002 and 2006, resulting in numbness on the right side of her face and hearing loss in her right ear.

Results
(with Seybold)

References

1965 births
American female pair skaters
Figure skaters at the 1988 Winter Olympics
Olympic figure skaters of the United States
Living people
People from Marion, Indiana
21st-century American women
20th-century American women